The Western Railroad Stone Arch Bridges and Chester Factory Village Depot is a National Historic Landmark District extending through parts of the towns of Chester, Middlefield, and Becket, Massachusetts.  It encompasses a section of the historic Western Railroad railbed, two stone bridges constructed in the 1840s under the direction of George Washington Whistler, and the c. 1862 railroad depot in the village of Chester Factory, which served the railroad as an important logistics point for the difficult crossing of The Berkshires to the west.  The section of railroad was the most expensive the company had to build, costing over $1 million in 1840.  A hiking trail providing viewing points to the lower seven bridges was opened in 2004.  All of the bridges are viewable via whitewater-appropriate watercraft from the river.

These properties were designated a National Historic Landmark in 2021, in recognition of its importance in the development of railroad technologies.  The graded crossing of the hills between Chester and the New York state line was an engineering challenge on a scale that had not previously been attempted by railroad engineers, and its success proved the ability of railroads to traverse steep grades using just friction.  The railroad was also the first inter-regional railroad, connecting the network of eastern New England to that of upstate New York.  The Chester Factory depot was an important stopping point for the railroad, where additional engines were added to westbound trains prior to traversing the steeper grades to the west.

The Chester Factory depot is a contributing element of the Chester Factory Village Historic District.  The two stone bridges included in the landmark designation, as well as the historic roadbed, are part of the Middlefield–Becket Stone Arch Railroad Bridge District; the bridges are listed as numbers 5 and 6 in that collection.

See also
Middlefield–Becket Stone Arch Railroad Bridge District
List of National Historic Landmarks in Massachusetts
List of bridges documented by the Historic American Engineering Record in Massachusetts
National Register of Historic Places listings in Berkshire County, Massachusetts
National Register of Historic Places listings in Hampshire County, Massachusetts
National Register of Historic Places listings in Hampden County, Massachusetts

References

Further reading

External links

Friends of the Keystone Arches
Historic American Engineering Record documentation:
 (Bridge No. 5)
 (Bridge No. 6)

Railroad bridges in Massachusetts
Historic districts in Berkshire County, Massachusetts
Historic districts in Hampshire County, Massachusetts
Geography of Hampden County, Massachusetts
Historic American Engineering Record in Massachusetts
National Register of Historic Places in Berkshire County, Massachusetts
National Register of Historic Places in Hampden County, Massachusetts
National Register of Historic Places in Hampshire County, Massachusetts
Historic districts on the National Register of Historic Places in Massachusetts
Railroad bridges on the National Register of Historic Places in Massachusetts
Stone bridges in the United States
Arch bridges in the United States
Buildings and structures in Hampden County, Massachusetts
Buildings and structures in Berkshire County, Massachusetts
Buildings and structures in Hampshire County, Massachusetts
National Historic Landmarks in Massachusetts